is a Japanese footballer.

Club statistics
Updated to 23 February 2020.

References

External links

Profile at Vissel Kobe

1997 births
Living people
Association football people from Hyōgo Prefecture
Japanese footballers
J1 League players
J3 League players
Vissel Kobe players
Fukushima United FC players
Tokyo United FC players
Association football defenders